Tideland is the third published book by author Mitch Cullin, and is the third installment of the writer's Texas Trilogy that also includes the coming-of-age novel Whompyjawed and the novel-in-verse Branches.

The story is a first-person narrative told by the young Jeliza-Rose, detailing the summer she spent alone at an isolated, rundown farmhouse in Texas called What Rocks.  With only the heads of old Barbie dolls to keep her company, Jeliza-Rose embarks on a series of highly imagined and increasingly surreal adventures in the tall grass surrounding the farmhouse.

Tideland was first published in the United States in 2000 by Dufour Editions. The book received major notices upon publication, including a review from New York Times Book Review which wrote that the novel was "brilliant and beautiful."  Some have favourably compared the book to earlier Southern Gothic American literature such as To Kill a Mockingbird and A Rose for Emily, while others, including Terry Gilliam and film producer Jeremy Thomas, have called the book a modern hybrid of Psycho and Alice's Adventures in Wonderland.  A subsequent United Kingdom paperback edition followed in 2003 from Weidenfeld & Nicolson, with Gilliam's infamous blurb on the cover: "F*cking wonderful!" Other editions have since been published in the Netherlands, Japan, France, Greece, Italy, Poland, Russia, Turkey, and Korea.

In 1999, Cullin sent a pre-publication galley to Gilliam for a cover blurb, but Gilliam so liked what he read that he optioned the book with an eye to direct. The controversial film version was produced by Gabriella Martinelli and Jeremy Thomas for Capri Films and Recorded Picture Company, and was directed by Gilliam and shot in Canada in 2004.  Cullin was given a brief cameo in the movie and contributed lyrics to the soundtrack, and the name "M. Cullin" appears on the mailbox at the farmhouse where much of the film takes place. The script adaptation was written by Gilliam and screenwriter Tony Grisoni.

Footnotes

See also

 Fantasy
 Southern Gothic
 Southern literature
 Speculative Fiction

External links
Official website for author Mitch Cullin
The novel's webpage with 1st chapter available to read

2000 American novels
Novels by Mitch Cullin
Native American novels
Novels set in Texas
Texas Trilogy
American novels adapted into films